Crematogaster ransonneti is a species of ant of the subfamily Myrmicinae. It can be found in Sri Lanka and India.

References

External links

 at antwiki.org
Animaldiversity.org
Itis.org

ransonneti
Hymenoptera of Asia
Insects described in 1868